Sean Whitaker (born 11 November 1953) is an Irish sailor. He competed in the Tempest event at the 1972 Summer Olympics.

References

External links
 

1953 births
Living people
Irish male sailors (sport)
Olympic sailors of Ireland
Sailors at the 1972 Summer Olympics – Tempest
Place of birth missing (living people)